Tuomas Huhtanen (born March 16, 1987) is a Finnish professional ice hockey left winger who currently plays for Jokipojat of the Mestis league. He used to play for Ässät.

References

External links

1987 births
People from Noormarkku
Living people
Ässät players
Lukko players
Finnish ice hockey left wingers
Sportspeople from Satakunta